Hugo Avendaño (March 8, 1927 – January 5, 1998) born Hugo Avendaño Espinoza was a Mexican singer and actor.

Career
He was a student of the Faculty of Medicine, UNAM, but abandoned his career of Medicine to studying singing in the position of baritone. He began his studies with lessons in vocal technique at the prestigious Academy of Singing. His teacher was Jose Pierson, who was also singing teacher to figures such as José Mojica, Alfonso Ortiz Tirado, Fanny Anitúa, Jorge Negrete, Pedro Vargas, Ramon Vinay, Francisco Avitia and José Sosa Esquivel. Later, he studied with private teachers like Rodriguez, Morelli, Rosette, then in New York at the Metropolitan Opera House with Dietch and Kimball and also with great baritone Leonard Warren.

In 1950 he debuted at the Palacio de Bellas Artes in Mexico, playing the role of Amonasro in the opera by Giuseppe Verdi, "Aida". He participated in several opera seasons in Mexico City, Guadalajara, Monterrey and Veracruz. His repertoire included operas such as Rigoletto, "Il trovatore" and "La traviata" by Verdi, Pagliacci "Faust", "Un Ballo In Maschera", "Tosca", Bizet's "Carmen" and Puccini's "Madama Butterfly", sharing the stage with eminent soprano Betty Fabila and presentations in concert with symphonic works by Darius Milhaud, "Carmina Burana", among others. He won the contest of the Gran Caruso and traveled to Brazil. He won the award for singing on the air at the Metropolitan Opera House in New York, in recognition of the great baritone Leonard Warren.

His romantic folk style and mastery of various musical genres led him to perform with great success in several countries in Latin America, Central America and United States in turn receiving several awards. He won several prizes and awards in Europe, Central and South America and the United States.

From 1955 he began to lean his professional singing in the genre of romantic popular Mexican music, performing and acting on radio in XEW and television with television Telesistema Mexicano programs "De visita a las 7" (1959) and "El Estudio de Pedro Vargas" (1959) and later in Televisa's on "Variedades de medianoche" in four episodes: "Vedettes y bohemia", "Presentando a los Randall", "Bohemia y una bella vedette" and "6 Invitados" (1977). He was one of the great stars of "La hora azul" by XEW radio station, and was also one of the best performers of the musician-poet and composer Agustín Lara, recording the album "Mis favoritas de Lara" under the record label RCA Records. As an example of Mexican folk music, he also played and recorded with the same label, songs from artists such as Manuel Ponce, Lorenzo Barcelata, Ignacio Fernandez Esperon "Tata Nacho" Alfonso Esparza Oteo, María Grever, Arturo Tolentino, Miguel Lerdo de Tejada and Francisco Gabilondo Soler "Cri-Cri".

Personal life
He was married many years with soprano Graziella Garza. Together they had 3 children: Hugo Avendaño, Rodrigo and Laura Graziella. He was afflicted for some years with pancreatic cancer and died on January 5, 1998.

Radio and television 
 The Blue Hour
 De visita a las 7
 El estudio de Pedro Vargas
 Variedades de Medianoche
 Noches Tapatías

Filmography 
 El Gallo Colorado (1957)
 Melodías inolvidables (1959)
 La Valentina (1966)

Romantic songs and popular hits 
 Júrame
 Rayando el sol
 A la orilla de un palmar
 Ojos de juventud
 Perjura
 Errante
 Altiva
 Morenita mía
 Maria Elena
 La borrachita
 Granada
 Ojos españoles
 La casita
 Nunca digas
 Un viejo amor
 Amapola
 El organillero
 Dime que sí
 Tipitipitín
 Negra consentida
 Divina mujer
 Janitzio
 Noche azul
 Collar de perlas
 Morir soñando
 Donde estás corazón
 Secreto eterno
 Cuando escuches este vals
 Por tí aprendí a querer
 Mientes
 Hay unos ojos
 No vuelvo a amar
 La norteña
 Marchita el alma
 Martha
 Alejandra (vals)
 Tú, tu y tú
 El faisán (vals)
 Oración Caribe
 Amor, amor
 Adiós Mariquita linda
 Adiós mi chaparrita
 Intimo secreto
 Madrigal Mexicano

References

External links

1927 births
1998 deaths
Mexican male television actors
Mexican male film actors
20th-century Mexican male opera singers
Male actors from Veracruz
Singers from Veracruz
20th-century Mexican male actors
People from Tuxpan, Veracruz
Deaths from cancer in Mexico
Deaths from pancreatic cancer